Clayton Hamilton may refer to:

 Clayton Hamilton (critic) (1881–1946), American drama critic
 Clayton Hamilton (baseball) (born 1982), American pitcher

See also
Clayton-Hamilton Jazz Orchestra